Song Weilong (born March 25, 1999) is a Chinese actor and model. He is best known for his roles as Yuan Song in Find Yourself and as Ling Xiao in Go Ahead.

Early life and education 
Song was born in Dalian, Liaoning, raised in a family with two older sisters. At age 9, Song Weilong developed an interest in classic martial arts after watching the action movie The New Legend of Shaolin starring Jet Li. He tried out for and learned wushu for a year in junior high school, and later enrolled in Shaolin Tagou Martial Arts School of Henan Province.

Career

2015–2018: Beginnings
In 2015, Song Weilong signed with Yu Zheng Studio and officially became an actor.
He made his first appearance in the variety show Run for Time, and also joined the talk show, Day Day Up. These appearances led to increased recognition for Song in China.

In 2016, he made his acting debut in the fantasy drama Demon Girl II. The same year, he was cast in the Chinese-South Korean production Catman; as well as in youth film Passage of My Youth produced by Hong Kong cinematographer Cheung Ka-fai. 

In 2017, Song starred in fantasy romance drama Long For You, adapted from the comic The Distance of Light Between You and Me. The series achieved 1 billion views throughout its run. The same year, he was also cast in the youth melodrama Beautiful Reborn Flower opposite Lin Yun.

In 2018, Song starred opposite Guan Xiaotong in the historical drama Untouchable Lovers; as well as sci-fi adventure film Dream Breaker.

2019–present: Rising success and comeback to television
In 2019, Song starred in the youth romance film Love The Way You Are. He won the Best New Actor award at the China Movie Channel Media Awards. Forbes China listed Song under their 30 Under 30 Asia 2019 list which consisted of 30 influential people under 30 years old who have had a substantial effect in their fields.

In 2020, Song starred in the romantic comedy drama Find Yourself alongside Victoria Song. The series was a hit and led to a rise in popularity for Song. Song then starred in the historical romance drama In a Class of Her Own, and  slice-of-life family drama Go Ahead. He ranked 45th on Forbes China Celebrity 100 list.

Philanthropy 
On March 19, 2016, Song attended the "Green Bicycle Tour" charity event in Chengdu as its youth ambassador. This event was sponsored and promoted by the cosmetics brand Innisfree. Song presented the Innisfree x Yongjiu crossover road bike collaboration and hosted the fan meeting afterwards.

Endorsements and ambassadorships
His Endorsements and ambassadorships includes international luxury brands Burberry, Emporio Armani's Accessories.

Since 2022, Japanese high-end jewelry brand Mikimoto announced Song as their first male Global Brand Ambassador.

Filmography

Film

Television series

Discography

Awards and nominations

Listicles

References

External links 
 Song Weilong's Official Sina Weibo
 

1999 births
Living people
Male actors from Dalian
Chinese male models
Chinese male television actors
Chinese male film actors
21st-century Chinese male actors
Chinese television presenters
Chinese broadcasters
VJs (media personalities)